Wigan St Judes are an amateur rugby league football club from Wigan, Greater Manchester. The club currently competes in the National Conference League. The club also operates a number of academy teams.

History
Wigan St Judes were formed in 1980 and began with just 20 child aged players. The club now has some 300 players from age 7 through to adults. Six youth teams play in the National Youth League. In 1991, the club moved to its present location in the Poolstock area of Wigan and operates three pitches and a clubhouse. The club also acts as one of the official feeder clubs for Wigan Warriors, the town's professional Super League club.

St Judes initially played in the North West Counties League and progressed to the Premier Division where they played for 3 seasons before applying for the National Conference League.

Players from the club to turn professional include;  Kris Radlinski, Mick Cassidy, Sean Long, Craig Makin, Wes Davies and Mark Smith.

On 10 April 2015, the club and the Wigan community mourned the loss of 14 year old promising St Judes youth player Miracle Godson, who tragically drowned in the Appley Bridge quarry.

Honours
 National Conference League Division One
 Winners (1)''': 2007–08

References

External links
Official website
St Judes on the NCL website

1980 establishments in England
English rugby league teams
Rugby league teams in Greater Manchester
Sport in Wigan
BARLA teams
Rugby clubs established in 1980